"Foster" is a short story or novella by Irish author Claire Keegan.

Plot
In 1981 Ireland, County Wexford, a  girl is sent to live with foster parents on a farm, while her mother gives birth. She has no notion of when she will return home. In the strangers' house she finds affection she has not known before, and slowly she begins to blossom in their care. But when a secret is suddenly revealed, she realizes how fragile her idyll is.

Reception
"Foster" has received a very positive reception, winning the 2009 Davy Byrne's Irish Writing Award (it was submitted for the award prior to publication). The Daily Telegraph compared it to the work of Seamus Heaney and William Trevor, while The Observer called it "Among the finest stories written recently in English." It is now on the English syllabus for the Leaving Certificate Examination.

Adaptation

An audio version of "Foster" was broadcast on BBC Radio 4's "Afternoon Reading" on 9 March 2015, read by Irish actress Evanna Lynch.

In 2022, a film version was released in the Irish language: An Cailín Ciúin, starring Catherine Clinch and Carrie Crowley. In 2023, the film was nominated for an Academy Award for Best International Feature Film.

References

Short stories by Claire Keegan
2010 short stories
Historical short stories
Irish short stories